Mildred Blanche Coles (July 18, 1920 – August 31, 1995) was an American actress and former beauty queen, from Warner Bros.

Early years
Coles was born in Los Angeles. The daughter of Thomas R. Coles and Josephine (Warrick) Coles, she graduated from Van Nuys High School and attended Occidental College.

Career 
Coles came to Hollywood after having acted on stage, initially working in two-reel comedies. She acted primarily in Western films, appearing in more than 20 films overall. Although she was known as a dramatic actress, she also sang and danced.

Coles was the leading lady in the RKO films Hurry, Charlie, Hurry (1941) and Play Girl (1941).

Personal life
Coles was married to John Rodney Frost, an attorney in Los Angeles.

Partial filmography

References

External links

1920 births
1995 deaths
American film actresses
20th-century American actresses